Athanasios "Thanasis" Patiniotis (Greek : Θανάσης Πατινιώτης, born 1 October 1993) is a professional Greek footballer, who plays for Atsalenios.

He plays as a midfielder for Atsalenios. Although the player had an agreement with AE Larissa on August 6, 2015, the club's major shareholder  Alexis Kougias, announced a day later that he finally won't join the "crimsons", following the recommendations of the team's coach Ratko Dostanić.

References

External links
 aelole.gr
 onsports.gr
 
 Aelole
 sports-academies.gr
 Athletic Larissa
 

1993 births
Living people
Sportspeople from Corfu
Greek footballers
Association football midfielders
Athlitiki Enosi Larissa F.C. players
Panachaiki F.C. players
A.O. Kerkyra players